RFNS Kikau (202) is a Pacific Forum patrol boat operated by Fiji. She was designed and built by Australia. Australia also provided training and infrastructure.

Operational history

Although Australia designed the vessels using commercial off-the-shelf components, so smaller countries, like Fiji, would find them easier to maintain, Fiji found the vessels hard to maintain, and there were periods where only Kula remained operational.

Kikau completed an extensive refit at Cairns, Australia on July 25, 2018.

Replacement

Australia started building 21 larger and more capable replacement vessels in 2017. Fiji is scheduled to receive two new vessels.  Kikau is expected to remain in service until 2022.

References

Ships of the Fijian Navy
Pacific Forum class patrol vessels
1995 ships